or  is a fjord on the south side of the island of Seiland in Alta Municipality, Troms og Finnmark county, Norway.

The mouth of the fjord is between Junkerhamnklubben to the west and Klubben to the east. Junkerhamn is a tiny farm the same size as the Junkerhamnklubben peninsula. Other than that one farm, there are no settlements around the fjord. The fjord sits a few kilometres south of Seiland National Park.

See also
 List of Norwegian fjords

References

Fjords of Troms og Finnmark
Alta, Norway